José A. Baca (June 23, 1876 – May 17, 1924) was an American politician from New Mexico. He served as the lieutenant governor of New Mexico from January 1, 1923, until his death on May 17, 1924.

Early life
Baca was born in Las Vegas, New Mexico, on June 23, 1876. A member of the Baca family of New Mexico, Baca raised livestock on his ranch in Rociada. He married Marguerite Pendaries on June 23, 1897.

Lieutenant governor
In 1922, the New Mexico Democratic Party nominated Baca for lieutenant governor of New Mexico. After winning the November election, he was sworn into office on January 1, 1923.

When Governor Hinkle left the state for a conference on October 8, 1923, Baca became acting governor. While serving as acting governor, he declared Columbus Day to be a state holiday and proclaimed October 27 to be Navy Day. Baca made an appointment to the board of regents and commuted the sentence of a prisoner.

Personal life
Baca and his wife had six children. Marguerite served as secretary of state of New Mexico from 1931 to 1936.

Baca died of pneumonia on May 17, 1924. He was buried in Las Vegas, New Mexico.

See also 
 List of minority governors and lieutenant governors in the United States

References

1876 births
1924 deaths
Baca family of New Mexico
New Mexico Democrats
Lieutenant Governors of New Mexico
People from Las Vegas, New Mexico